Nenana Municipal Airport  is a city-owned public-use airport located one mile (1.6 km) south of the central business district of Nenana, a city in the Yukon-Koyukuk Census Area of the U.S. state of Alaska.

Facilities and aircraft 
It also has a seaplane landing area designated 4W/22W which measures 3,601 x 100 ft (1,098 x 30 m).

For 12-month period ending December 31, 2005, the airport had 6,000 aircraft operations, an average of 16 per day: 58% general aviation and 42% air taxi. There are 15 aircraft based at this airport: 93% single engine and 7% multi-engine.

References

External links 
 FAA Alaska airport diagram (GIF)

Airports in the Yukon–Koyukuk Census Area, Alaska